The 1970–71 Los Angeles Kings season was the Kings' fourth season of operation in the National Hockey League (NHL). The Kings finished in fifth place in the West Division and did not qualify for the playoffs.

Offseason

Regular season

Final standings

Schedule and results

Playoffs

Player statistics

Awards and records

Transactions
The Kings were involved in the following transactions during the 1970–71 season.

Trades

Free agent signings

Intra-league Draft

Reverse Draft

Expansion Draft

Draft picks
Los Angeles's draft picks at the 1970 NHL Amateur Draft held at the Queen Elizabeth Hotel in Montreal, Quebec.

Farm teams

See also
1970–71 NHL season

References

External links
 

Los
Los
Los Angeles Kings seasons
Los
Los